is an irregular shaped asteroid and sub-kilometer near-Earth object that passed near the Earth on 7 July 2015, at a distance of 442,000 kilometers or 1.15 lunar distances.

First observed on 19 April 2015, by astronomers of the Dark Energy Survey at Cerro Tololo Observatory in Chile, the asteroid measures approximately 60 meters in diameter and is classified as a member of the Apollo and Amor group, respectively. It is a fast rotator with a rotation period of 22.6 minutes.

Discovery 

It was first observed on 19 April 2015, by astronomers of the Dark Energy Survey, using the Dark Energy Camera (DECam) mounted on the Víctor M. Blanco Telescope located at Cerro Tololo Inter-American Observatory in Chile.

Orbit and classification 

 has been classified as a near-Earth object of the Apollo and Amor group, respectively.

It orbits the Sun at a distance of 1.0–4.0 AU once every 4.01 years (1,465 days). Its orbit has an eccentricity of 0.60 and an inclination of 1° with respect to the ecliptic. The body's observation arc begins with a precovery taken at Cerro Tololo, the night prior to its official first observation.

Close encounters 

This was the asteroid's closest approach to Earth until at least 2419.

Physical characteristics 

 is an assumed to be a stony S-type asteroid.

Rotation and shape 

Lightcurve analysis gave a rotation period of 0.3761 and 0.3763 hours (22.6 minutes) with a brightness amplitude of 1.50 and 1.29 magnitude, indicative of a non-spheroidal shape. It is among the fastest rotators known to exists.

These observations confirmed the body's short rotation period and complex and irregular, and revealed, that it has a long-axis extent of 80–100 meters with an equatorial aspect ratio of about 2:1. Any significant non-principal axis rotation, commonly known as "tumbling" could be ruled out. The radar images also showed angular features up to approximately 30 meters across, with a cluster of radar-bright pixels following its rotation, and consistent with a high standing, 15 to 20 meters wide feature.

Diameter and albedo 

The Collaborative Asteroid Lightcurve Link assumes a standard albedo for stony asteroids of 0.20 and calculates a mean-diameter of 57.0 meters based on an absolute magnitude of 23.6. At its widest point, the object is 80 meters long.

Numbering and naming 

As of 2017, this minor planet has neither been numbered nor named.

References

External links 
 Close Pass of Near-Earth Asteroid 2015 HM10, Lunar and Planetary Institute
 Asteroid Lightcurve Database (LCDB), query form (info )
 
 
 

Minor planet object articles (unnumbered)

20150707
20150419